Marjolein Beumer (born Janssen; 27 October 1966, Amstelveen, North Holland) is a Dutch actress. She is the sister of actress Famke Janssen and director Antoinette Beumer. She is married to fellow performer Rik Launspach.

Filmography

Actor 

 Survival (1992) (TV) Jessica
 De Vlinder Tilt de kat op (1994) Linda
 JuJu (1996) Katrien
 Unit 13 Elly (2 episodes, 1996)
 Baantjer Helen de Winter / Marjolein Tazelaar (2 episodes, 1997/1999)
 Zebra (1998) TV Series Liesbeth
 De Geheime dienst (2000) TV Series Wilma van Hall
 De 9 dagen van de gier (2001) TV Series Ellen Vermeer
 Trauma 24/7 (2002) TV Series Astrid van der Linden, Hoofd SEH
 Long Distance (2003/I) Moeder
 Wet & Waan Mieke (1 episode, 2004)
 De Kroon (2004) (mini) TV Series Interpreter
 Bezet (2004)
 Grijpstra & de Gier Kristel Rilke (1 episode, 2005)
 Moes ROC teacher (2008 Dutch TV Series)
 De storm Minister (2009)
 Soof Arts (2013)
 Flikken Maastricht Angelique Meertens (5 episodes, 2014)

Writer 
 Sophie (2015)
 Rendez-Vous (2015)
 Soof (2013)
 De Storm (2009)
 Moes (2008)
 Bezet (2004)

External links

References

1966 births
Living people
Dutch film actresses
Dutch television actresses
People from Amstelveen
20th-century Dutch actresses
21st-century Dutch actresses